Budějovice may refer to:

České Budějovice, a town in Bohemia, Czech Republic 
Moravské Budějovice, a town in Moravia, Czech Republic